Dr. Maria Ruth B. Pineda-Cortel is an associate professor and laboratory coordinator at the University of Santo Tomas (UST) where she teaches at the Department of Medical Technology of the Faculty of Pharmacy. She also does research at the university's Research Center for the Natural Sciences and Applied Sciences (RCNAS). Pineda-Cortel has done extensive research focusing on gestational diabetes mellitus (GDM, also known as diabetes during pregnancy) and polycystic ovarian syndrome (PCOS) as a way to shed light on diseases that only affect women. As a woman of science, she advocates and works towards improving healthcare for women. Pineda-Cortel has also done research covering many health-related issues that include the effects of climate change on infectious diseases that are prevalent in the Philippines, such as dengue and malaria.

Education 
Pineda-Cortel studied at the University of Santo Tomas in Manila, Philippines where she received all of her degrees: Bachelor of Science in Medical Technology, Master of Science in Medical Technology, and Doctor of Philosophy with a major in Biological Sciences.

Career and research

Gestational Diabetes Mellitus 
Pineda-Cortel focuses her research on early-detection and diagnosis of GDM in pregnant women in the Philippines. The prevalence of GDM in the Philippines is around 30%, and Pineda-Cortel aims to increase accessibility and availability of standard diagnostic and screening tests for GDM to prevent further health complications in the mother and the baby. Her goal is to find early genetic biomarkers that can be identified in pregnant women to prevent the development of GDM. She carries out her experiments by collecting blood samples every trimester from a group of pregnant women with no diabetes (non-GDM group) and another group of pregnant women that have diabetes before pregnancy and/or had GDM during past pregnancies (GDM group). The RNA from the blood samples are then analyzed through differential gene expression to compare the read counts of relevant genes between the non-GDM group and the GDM group during first, second, and third trimester. In one of her studies, she concludes that the gene variant rs7754840 of the  CDKAL1 gene (known to inhibit insulin production) does not increase susceptibility to GDM. Another one of her studies also suggests that iron deficiency anemia in pregnant women decreases the risk of developing GDM. Pineda-Cortel's research is an effort to end the cycle of transgenerational diabetes as its prevalence continues to increase all over the world.

Dengue and climate change 
Pineda-Cortel also does research to determine the effects of climate change and other environmental factors on dengue incidence and number of cases per region. Her studies show a strong correlation between the incidence of dengue and temperature, rainfall and humidity. Because the Philippines lie in the tropics, these three climate variables are the main driving force of dengue fever. Warmer temperatures speed up the extrinsic incubation period of the dengue virus and the development of mosquitoes which increases disease transmission rates. In addition, her research also demonstrates that rainfall contributes to an increase in dengue cases as stagnant water provides breeding grounds for mosquitoes. With these contributing factors in mind, Pineda-Cortel developed prediction models of dengue cases in four studied regions in the Philippines.

Selected publications

Awards and recognition

References

External links 
 

Wikipedia Student Program
21st-century Filipino scientists
Filipino women scientists
Diabetes
Filipino biologists
Women biologists
Climate change
Dengue fever
Filipino educators
21st-century scientists
Women educators
Tropical diseases
Parasitic diseases
Clinical chemists
Living people

Year of birth missing (living people)
ASEAN
University of Santo Tomas
University of Santo Tomas alumni
Academic staff of the University of Santo Tomas